Joan Busfield (born 22 June 1940), is a British sociologist and psychologist, Professor of Sociology at the University of Essex and former President of the British Sociological Association (2003–2005). Her research focuses on psychiatry and mental disorder.

Education 
She originally trained as a clinical psychologist at the Tavistock Clinic, and holds an MA from St Andrews, and an MA and a PhD from Essex.

Selected bibliography

Journal articles 

Busfield, J., (2017). The concept of medicalisation reassessed: a rejoinder. Sociology of Health and Illness. 39 (5), 781-783  
Busfield, J., (2017). The Concept of Medicalisation Reassessed. Sociology of Health and Illness. 39 (5), 759-774  
Busfield, J., (2015). Assessing the overuse of medicines. Social Science & Medicine. 131, 199-206 
Busfield, J., (2012). Challenging claims that mental illness has been increasing and mental well-being declining.. Social Science & Medicine. 75 (3), 581-8  
Busfield, J., (2010). ?A pill for every ill?: Explaining the expansion in medicine use. Social Science & Medicine. 70 (6), 934-941 
Busfield, J., (2007). Sociological Understandings of the Pharmaceutical Industry: A Response to John Abraham. Sociology. 41 (4), 737-739  
Busfield, J., (2006). Pills, Power, People: Sociological Understandings of the Pharmaceutical Industry. Sociology. 40 (2), 297-314 
Busfield, J., (2004). Mental health problems, psychotropic drug technologies and risk. Health, Risk & Society. 6 (4), 361-375  
Busfield, J., (2004). Class and gender in twentieth-century British psychiatry: shell-shock and psychopathic disorder.. Clio medica (Amsterdam, Netherlands). 73, 295-322 
Busfield, J., (2003). Globalization and the Pharmaceutical Industry Revisited. International Journal of Health Services. 33 (3), 581-605  
Busfield, J., (2000). Introduction: Rethinking the sociology of mental health. Sociology of Health & Illness. 22 (5), 543-558  
Busfied, J., (1999). Mental Health Policy: making gender and ethnicity visible. Policy & Politics. 27 (1), 57-73  
Busfield, J., (1998). Restructuring mental health services in twentieth century Britain.. Clio medica (Amsterdam, Netherlands). 49, 9-28  
Busfield, J., (1995). Medicine and the Five Senses (Book).. Sociology of Health and Illness. 17 (1), 123-124  
Busfield, J., (1994). The Female Malady? Men, Women and Madness in Nineteenth Century Britain. Sociology. 28 (1), 259-277  
Busfield, J., (1992). Feminism and Psychoanalytic Theory (Book).. Sociology of Health and Illness. 14 (4), 539-540 
Busfield, J., (1991). Governing the Soul: The shaping of the private self (Book).. Sociology of Health and Illness. 13 (2), 276-278  
Busfield, J., (1991). Mind, Stress and Health (Book).. Sociology of Health and Illness. 13 (1), 118-119  
Busfield, J., (1990). Sectoral Divisions in Consumption: The Case of Medical Care. Sociology. 24 (1), 77-96  
Busfield, J., (1989). Sexism and Psychiatry. Sociology. 23 (3), 343-364  
Busfield, J., (1988). Mental illness as social product or social construct: a contradiction in feminists’ arguments?. Sociology of Health & Illness. 10 (4), 521-542  
Busfield, J., (1987). The Cultural Meeting of Popular Science: Phrenology and the organization of consent in nineteenth-century Britain (Book).. Sociology of Health and Illness. 9 (2), 215-217  
Busfield, J., (1983). Madmen and the Bourgeoisie: A Social History of Insanity and Psychiatry/Madhouses, Mad-Doctors and Madmen: The Social History of Psychiatry in the Victorian Era (Book).. Sociology of Health and Illness. 5 (1), 107-108 
Busfield, J., (1982). Gender and Mental Illness. International Journal of Mental Health. 11 (1-2), 46-66 
Busfield, J., (1980). The Dignity of Labour? A study of childbearing and induction. Sociology. 14 (1), 157-159 
Busfield, J., (1977). Anthony Clare, Psychiatry in Dissent; Controversial Issues in Thought and Practice. London. Sociology. 11 (3), 563-564 
Busfield, J., (1972). Age at marriage and family size: social causation and social selection hypotheses. Journal of Biosocial Science. 4 (01), 117-134 
Busfield, J. and Hawthorn, G., (1971). Some social determinants of recent trends in British fertility. Journal of Biosocial Science. 3 (S3), 65-77 
Busfield, J. and Hawthorn, G., (1971). Some social determinants of recent trends in British fertility.. Journal of biosocial science. Supplement (3), 65-77 
Busfield, J., (1969). College Women and Fertility Values. Sociology. 3 (3), 449-449

References

1940 births
Alumni of the University of St Andrews
Alumni of the University of Essex
British sociologists
Mental health researchers
Living people
Presidents of the British Sociological Association
British women sociologists